Prestbury is a civil parish in Cheshire East, England. It contains 51 buildings that are recorded in the National Heritage List for England as designated listed buildings.  Of these, one is listed at Grade I, the highest grade, three are listed at Grade II*, the middle grade, and the others are at Grade II.  Many of the listed buildings are in the village of Prestbury, including houses, a church and associated structures, shops, a bank, hotels, a public house, the village stocks, the entrance to a railway tunnel, and a telephone kiosk.  In the surrounding countryside the listed buildings are more houses, farms and farm buildings, parish boundary stones, an ancient cross, and mileposts.

Key

Buildings

See also

Listed buildings in Adlington
Listed buildings in Bollington
Listed buildings in Macclesfield
Listed buildings in Over Alderley
Listed buildings in Mottram St Andrew
Listed buildings in Hazel Grove and Bramhall

References
Citations

Sources

Listed buildings in the Borough of Cheshire East
Lists of listed buildings in Cheshire